Trenoweth ("new town") is a small settlement, located in the north of the island of St Mary's in the Isles of Scilly, Cornwall, England.

It is situated in an inland and rural part of the island, northwest of Maypole (via Watermill and Borough) and east of Telegraph (via Pungie's Lane). Also nearby, to the northeast, is Innisidgen, a prehistoric site on the coast.

The Isles of Scilly Wildlife Trust are based in Trenoweth.

Local industries centre on the cut flower industry, and Trenoweth has related warehousing and a shop (Trenoweth Flowers). There is also a field used for outdoor boat storage (particularly during winter). Otherwise the settlement consists of agricultural buildings and houses.

There was once a distinction between Higher Trenoweth and Lower Trenoweth, however Lower Trenoweth has become a single dwelling named Bristow unconnected with (Higher) Trenoweth and no longer bears the name Trenoweth in its address.

References

Hamlets in the Isles of Scilly
Populated places on St Mary's, Isles of Scilly